Olcegepant (INN, code name BIBN-4096BS) is a calcitonin gene-related peptide receptor antagonist being studied as a potential treatment for migraines.

A 2013 meta-analysis found olcegepant and telcagepant were effective and safe compared to placebo.

See also 
 Telcagepant

References 

Amines
Antimigraine drugs
Carboxamides
Organobromides
Piperazines
Piperidines
4-Pyridyl compounds
Quinazolines
Calcitonin gene-related peptide receptor antagonists